Doppelgänger is the fifth studio album by Christian alternative rock band Daniel Amos issued on their own Alarma! Records label in 1983. It is the second album in their ¡Alarma! Chronicles album cycle.

Content
Doppelgänger is much darker than the album that preceded it, ¡Alarma!. The album starts with the eerie backward sounds of "Hollow Man" (inspired by T. S. Eliot's poem, The Hollow Men). Taylor's lyrics to "I Didn't Build it For Me", "Autographs for the Sick", and "New Car" were sharp attacks on televangelists, anticipating the Jimmy Swaggart/Jim Bakker/Robert Tilton scandals of 1987–88.

Doppelgänger is the second of a four-part series of albums by DA entitled The ¡Alarma! Chronicles, which also includes ¡Alarma!, Vox Humana and Fearful Symmetry. In the tour that followed the release, the band presented a full multimedia event, complete with video screens synchronized to the music, something that was unusual in the early 1980s for any Christian band. The stage presentation even prompted heckling at some shows.

This album, along with the other three albums from the Alarma! Chronicles, was rereleased as part of the Alarma! Chronicles book-set in 2000. The book set included three CDs, over 200 pages of lyrics, photos, liner notes, essays, interviews and other information in a hardcover book.

Reissue
In 2014, 
Born Twice Records revisited the album as part of its ongoing deluxe reissue series re-issued the album as a two-CD.

Track listing

Side one
 "Hollow Man" (Taylor)  (2:46)
 "Mall (All Over the World)" (Taylor) (3:17)
 "Real Girls" (Taylor, Chamberlain)  (3:01)
 "New Car!" (Taylor)  (2:01)
 "Do Big Boys Cry" (Taylor)  (2:07)
 "Youth With a Machine" (Taylor) (2:45)
 "The Double" (Taylor)  (3:56)
 "Distance and Direction" (Taylor) (2:55)

Side two
 "Memory Lane" (Taylor)  (3:51)
 "Angels Tuck You In" (Taylor)  (2:45)
 "Little Crosses" (Chamberlain)  (2:40)
 "Autographs for the Sick" (words by Taylor, music by Taylor, Chamberlain, Chandler)  (1:42)
 "I Didn't Build It for Me" (words by Taylor, music by Taylor, Chamberlain)  (2:50)
 "Here I Am" (Taylor)  (3:16)
 "Hollow Man (Reprise)" (Taylor)  (0:53)

Deluxe edition bonus disc 
 "Hollow Man" [Alternate]
 "Mall (All Over the World)" [Alternate]
 Concert Intro
 "Real Girls" [Live]
 "New Car!" [Live]
 "Do Big Boys Cry" [Instrumental]
 "Youth with a Machine" [Toy Mix]
 "The Double" [Extended Rough]
 "Distance and Direction" [Alternate]
 "Distance and Direction" [Vocal Mix]
 "Memory Lane" [Live]
 "Angels Tuck You In" [Rough]
 "Little Crosses" [Fragment]
 "Autographs for the Sick" [Alternate]
 "I Didn’t Build It For Me" [Alternate]
 "Here I Am" [Instrumental] 
 "Hollow Man" (Reprise) [Alternate]

Personnel
 Jerry Chamberlain – lead guitars, background vocals, lead vocal on "Little Crosses", spoken lead vocal on "Autographs For The Sick", percussion
 Tim Chandler – bass guitar, background vocals, percussion
 Ed McTaggart – drums, background vocals, percussion
 Terry Scott Taylor – rhythm guitars, lead vocals

 Additional musicians
 Tom Howard – keyboards, background vocals
 Mark Cook – keyboards, background vocals
 Marty Dieckmeyer – keyboards, bass
 Jeff Lams – keyboards
 Rob Watson – keyboards
 Bill Colton – saxophone
 Alex MacDougall – percussion
 Randy Stonehill – background vocals
 Derri Daugherty – background vocals
 Janet McTaggart – background vocals
 Dori Howard – background vocals
 The Three Women from Istanbul – background vocals
 Emilia Emulator – background vocals

 Production notes
 Thom Roy – engineering
 Derri Daugherty – second engineer
 Recorded and mixed at Whitefield Studios, Santa Ana, California
 Steve Hall - mastering (at MCA Whitney)
 Rehearsals and arrangements recorded at the Rebel Base, Santa Ana
 Derrill Bazzy – art direction, photography, album art concepts
 Bonnie Ferguson – photography
 Terry Taylor – album art concepts
 Phillip Mangano – album art concepts
 Keyboards arranged by Taylor/Chamberlain/Howard
 Tom Gulotta – project coordinator
 Eric Townsend – alternate bonus mixes
 Re-mastered by J Powell at Steinhaus

References 

1983 albums
Daniel Amos albums